is a retired Japanese badminton player from NTT East team. He now works as a NTT East singles coach.

Career 
Sato started to playing badminton when he was a kid, influenced by his parents who used to playing badminton as a hobby. He then joined Kodaira club when he was in the third grade of elementary school. He won four Japanese National Championships in a row between 2003 and 2006.

Sato made his first appearance at the Olympic Games in 2004 Athens, competed in the men's singles, losing in the round of 32 to Bao Chunlai of China. He also played at the 2008 Beijing Olympics and won the men's singles round of 32 and lost in the round of 16.

Sato also represented Japan as the third singles in the 2010 Thomas Cup held in Kuala Lumpur, Malaysia. He played as the third singles and against Malaysia in the group stage, he shocked the hosts after defeating Muhammad Hafiz Hashim, after the team staged a huge comeback from 0–2 down to win 3–2 over the hosts.

At the 2012 London Olympics, he competed with Naoki Kawamae in the men's doubles.

Achievements

BWF Grand Prix 
The BWF Grand Prix had two levels, the BWF Grand Prix and Grand Prix Gold. It was a series of badminton tournaments sanctioned by the Badminton World Federation (BWF) which was held from 2007 to 2017. The World Badminton Grand Prix has been sanctioned by International Badminton Federation (IBF) from 1983 to 2006.

Men's singles

Men's doubles

  BWF Grand Prix Gold tournament
  BWF Grand Prix tournament

BWF International Challenge/Series 
Men's singles

Men's doubles

  BWF International Challenge tournament
  BWF International Series tournament

References

External links 
 Shōji Satō at www.joc.or.jp

1982 births
Living people
People from Higashimurayama, Tokyo
Japanese male badminton players
Badminton players at the 2004 Summer Olympics
Badminton players at the 2008 Summer Olympics
Badminton players at the 2012 Summer Olympics
Olympic badminton players of Japan
Badminton players at the 2006 Asian Games
Asian Games competitors for Japan
Badminton coaches